Aksu is a quarter of the town Fındıklı, Fındıklı District, Rize Province, northeastern Turkey. Its population is 2,240 (2021).

History 
According to list of villages in Laz language book (2009), name of the neighbourhood is  Abunogha, which means "Abu bazaar". Most inhabitants of the neighbourhood are ethnically Laz.

References

Populated places in Fındıklı District
Laz settlements in Turkey